This is a list of the NCAA indoor champions in the short sprint event.  Generally that was the 60 yard dash until 1983, 55 meter dash 1984 to 1999, and the 60 meters being contested thereafter.  Hand timing was used until 1975, starting in 1976 fully automatic timing was used.

Champions
Key
y=yards
w=wind aided
A=Altitude assisted

60 Yards

55 Meters

60 Meters

References

GBR Athletics

External links
NCAA Division I men's indoor track and field

NCAA Men's Division I Indoor Track and Field Championships
Indoor track, men